The Journal of the Academic Association of Koreanology in Japan (Jp. Chōsen gakuhō 朝鮮学報) is a Japanese/Korean/English-language scholarly journal published by the Tenri University, a private university in Tenri, Nara Prefecture, Japan. The journal features articles and book reviews of current scholarship in East Asian Studies, focusing on Korean and Japanese history, literature and religion, with occasional coverage of politics and linguistics.

Publishing history
The journal was published regularly since 1956 as the bulletin of Chōsen Gakkai 朝鮮学会 (Academic Association of Koreanology at Tenri University).

References
 http://www.tenri-u.ac.jp/soc/dv457k0000000h7t.html Tenri University Academic Association of Koreanology Information Page. (Japanese)

External links
 https://web.archive.org/web/20081101140537/http://www.tenri-u.ac.jp/en/facilities/academic.html Tenri University publications
 http://ci.nii.ac.jp/vol_issue/nels/AN00146954_jp.html Full list of issues available on CiNii (Japanese) (Cf.Zasshi Kiji Sakuin). 

East Asian studies journals
Cultural journals
Korean studies journals
English-language journals
Publications established in 1956